This is a list of radio stations in the Wellington Region of New Zealand.

Note: Several FM stations changed their frequency during October 2010, as broadcast licenses were renewed and spacing standardized to 0.8 MHz. AM stations were also moved in 1978 when New Zealand switched from 10 kHz frequency spacing to 9 kHz spacing.

Wellington metro radio stations

FM Stations

As a general rule, full-power FM frequencies in Wellington are spaced 0.8 MHz apart, starting from 89.3 MHz.

Some Hutt Valley "infill" frequencies with transmitters at Towai or Fitzherbert have been allocated to the 0.4 MHz "gap" in between other stations.

AM Stations

Decommissioned Frequencies
The following frequencies were previously used in the Wellington region, but most were decommissioned in the reallocation of frequencies in October 2010.

It is unlikely that most of these FM frequencies will be re-used as most do not fit within the current band spacing plan.  Possible exceptions are 102.1/102.9 FM and 96.9 FM that fit the band plans for Wellington and Hutt Valley respectively.

Low Power FM
There are a number of Low Power FM stations that are operating, or have operated, in Wellington whose broadcast range may be less than that of the full-power FM stations.

Wellington

AREC FM, 107.0, mono, BBC World Service. Good coverage of CBD right out to the airport and the station is commercial free.
Calvary Chapel Radio, 106.9 stereo, near Newtown, Christian Radio
Critical Analysis Broadcasting 107.1 FM, broadcasting to Kilbirnie, Melrose and Miramar, was on 107.5 til 8 March Talks of left-green persuasion
Family Radio - Karori, 106.9 FM, Stereo, Bible centred and God glorifying broadcast. Bible readings, music, studies, and talkback discussion
Fleet FM, 107.3FM Wellington from July 2003 until May 2010
George FM, 106.7, (replaced Rova 1067 September 2019). Appears to be transmitting from on or around Victoria University in Kelburn
Groove FM, 106.8, mono, located at Trades Hall, used for uplink to 107.7 transmitter 
Groove FM, 107.7, mono, some adverts, broadcasting from the CBD area
High-Fi FM, 107.3, Wellington High School radio station
Human FM, 88.1 stereo, eclectic music, poetry, Christian, broadcasting from Victoria University Anglican Chaplaincy (started May 2007)
Kix FM 87.6 stereo, CBD, Capital Rock
Kool FM, 107.3 stereo, adverts, NZ Radio School, Cuba Street
Maranui FM, 106.7FM Lyall Bay School since 2008
Matrix 107.5 FM mono, music and educational material
Mix FM 87.9 MHz stereo, Grenada Village, Churton Park, Johnsonville, northern suburbs, Pop/rock music ranging from the 80s to today's hottest tracks.
MUNTfm, 88.5 stereo, broadcasting from old Museum, now Massey University, music mix incl. NZ music (monitored to have played Half a Bat Cat) 
Muse Radio, 87.9FM, Student radio Wellington Central
only around Oriental Bay, 107.3, nice jazz, low power
Radio Brooklyn, 106.9 mono, 0.5 Watts but superior location, opened 12. Feb 2008, plays copyright free speeches and university lectures, at 7pm relays Radio Netherlands Newsdesk and Democracy Now.
Radio Island Bay 107.5 FM mono, broadcasting from Island Bay
Radio Karori, 107.5 mono, political talks
Radio Melina 107.4 MHz FM, stereo 1W output, broadcasting from Seatoun,  .
Radio Rainbow, 107.6
Rova 1067, 106.7FM down town Wellington "The Rova All Day Breakfast with Polly & Grant" live and then replayed, started July 2017 (Stuff), George FM reinstated September 2019
Up FM, 88.1FM Wellington, dance music launched October 2006
Te Upoko O Te Ika, 87.6FM (simulcast of 1161AM) Maori radio Wellington CBD
The Sound FM, 88.7, Plays all your hit music and your favorite jams from the 70s to today  with shows that cater for everyone.
The Wedge 88.1 FM, Newtown, weekday evenings
TLC Radio, 88.0 FM, country music broadcasting for Wellington CBD, Mt Vic & inner hill suburbs
Tourist Information, 88.2, (near Duxton Hotel) plays an old tape loop with obsolete info

Upper Hutt, Lower Hutt and Petone
107.2 Secret FM, 107.2FM Lower Hutt Central, Youth radio established 2012
107.7 FM HIBS Student Radio, Hutt International Boys' School, Trentham, Upper Hutt
andHow.FM 107.5, Stereo, Mangaroa Valley, Indie Rock
Boom FM, 88.7, Electronica interspersed with classics and kiwi sounds
Calvary Chapel Radio, 106.9, Christian Radio
Core FM, 107.1 FM, Alicetown
Hutt City FM, 106.7 FM, Lower Hutt
Hutt Radio, 88.3 FM (previously 106.1 and 106.7 FM), Lower Hutt
KIX-FM was a fully commercial rock radio station with studios in central Lower Hutt, Wellington, New Zealand. First going to air in 1993, it filled a gap in Wellington for a rock station when the former Radio Windy reformatted to an easy listening format as The Breeze in 1993. All the on-air staff on KIX FM were volunteers and new to radio. After the station went off-air in 1996 many of the original staff went on to work at some of the New Zealand's biggest radio stations including Mike Currie (Thrasher) on Radio Hauraki & The Sound, Spiros Foundoulakis went to More FM Wellington, Kris Miller worked for The Breeze in Wellington and David Cunningham (deceased) moved to Port FM in Timaru. After going off-air it was resurrected in 2001 as a low power FM radio station and is completely commercial free. Originally on 106.7FM, then 88.7 FM and 87.6FM 2010 - 2017, the station streams on the internet and is completely automated.
Robot FM, 107.5 mono, Lower Hutt, broadcasting political talks (started May 2006)
Supernova, 107.0, mellower music mix + NZ
The Cheese FM, 87.9, Stereo, Lower Hutt. Broadcasting to Central Lower Hutt and the CBD Area. Hits of the 80's 90s and Today.
The Hutt Valleys River FM  88 Upper Hutt and 87.6 Central Hutt, The station has been broadcasting since Feb 2009. We are a community station broadcasting live morning shows Mon-Fri with community & up to date commuter information as well as a wide range of music. Totally local the Hutts Best Music River FM and also streaming on www.riverfm.co.nz   "click" the listen now button

Porirua
AREC FM, 87.6, mono, Porirua, BBC World Service, simulcast on 87.9 Kapiti (see table below), and Wellington 107.0, in the CBD.  Good coverage on SH1 from Johnsonville to Pukerua Bay Bay and the station is commercial free.
Genesis FM, 88.1, mono, Porirua, Bible preaching
S-FM, 88.3, stereo, Broadcasting from Pak'nSave, Porirua, Top 40, Urban, no broadcasts 13th,17th March 2018
Tawa College FM, tba, Tawa only, plays rock songs apart from 1:20 - 2:15 on weekdays when there is a talk show
World FM, 88.2, stereo, Tawa, World Music plus relays of WRN & Radio Six International

Digital Audio Broadcasting (DAB) trial in Wellington

Kordia operated a (DAB) test service between October 2006 and 30 June 2018.  At the conclusion the trial transmissions were from Mt Kaukau in Band III on 192.352 MHz.  The multiplex delivered a mix of DAB and DAB+ programmes over nearly 12 years.  The programmes at the conclusion of the trial were:

Kapiti Coast Horowhenua Radio Stations

Radio Kapiti, (frequency not recorded) holiday broadcaster

Wairarapa Radio Stations

References

Wellington
Wellington Region
Radio stations in Wellington